Mihail Zervos is a Greek financial mathematician. He is Professor of Financial Mathematics at the London School of Economics.

Curriculum 

Zervos received his MSc and PhD degrees from Imperial College London in 1995. After completing his PhD, he was a lecturer at the Department of Statistics, University of Newcastle, where he stayed until 2000. He then joined King's College London, initially as a lecturer and then as a reader in the Department of Mathematics. In 2006 he was appointed to the Chair in Financial Mathematics at the London School of Economics where he was tasked with founding a new Research Group in Financial Mathematics within the Departement of Mathematics.

References

 D. Brody, J. Syroka and M. Zervos: "Dynamical pricing of weather derivatives". Quantitative Finance 2 (2002), 189–198.
 K. Duckworth, M. Zervos: "A model for investment decisions with switching costs", Annals of Applied Probability, vol.11, 1, 2001, pp. 239–260
 Davis, M. H. A. and Zervos, M. (1994) "A problem of singular stochastic control with discretionary stopping". ''Annals of Applied Probability 4, 226–240.

External links 
  Professor Zervos
  Prof Mihail Zervos on ATACD
 Appointment of New Chair in Financial Maths (September 2006)

Academics of the London School of Economics
Greek mathematicians
Greek engineers
National Technical University of Athens alumni
Living people
Greek emigrants to the United Kingdom
Academics of King's College London
Year of birth missing (living people)